Joan Mas i Ramon (Barcelona, 1934) is a post-impressionist style fine artist based at Barcelona and Paris.

Biography 
Joan Mas was born in Barcelona in 1934. He went to Paris in the late 1950s, when he studied painting under the guidance of Roger Chastel at the ENSBA (École Nationale Supérieure des Beaux-Arts) in Paris, from 1961 to 1968. Since then, his work has been exhibited mainly in Europe, specially at Barcelona and Paris.

.

Work 
His painting was created in the post-impressionism with influences of cubism, abstract art and the new figurative. It departs from the conventional dogmas of landscape painting, to give life to a remarkably personal language.

References 

1934 births
20th-century Spanish painters
20th-century Spanish male artists
Spanish male painters
People from Barcelona
Living people
École des Beaux-Arts alumni